Abantis bismarcki, Bismarck's paradise skipper, is a butterfly in the family Hesperiidae. It is found in Guinea, Ivory Coast, Ghana, Togo, northern Nigeria, Cameroon, the Democratic Republic of the Congo, southern Sudan, Uganda and western Kenya. The habitat consists of the transition zone between dry forests and Guinea savanna.

References

Butterflies described in 1892
Tagiadini
Butterflies of Africa
Taxa named by Ferdinand Karsch